Dlouhoňovice is a municipality and village in Ústí nad Orlicí District in the Pardubice Region of the Czech Republic. It has about 800 inhabitants.

Etymology
The name is probably derived from dlouhé hony, which meant long narrow fields.

References

External links

 

Villages in Ústí nad Orlicí District